Mauritz Amundsen (4 June 1904 – 8 March 1982) was a Norwegian Olympic sport shooter, and World Champion from 1931.

He became World Champion in 1931, and team champion in 1947. He competed at three Olympics, in 1936, 1948 and 1952 with 11th place as best result.

References

1904 births
1982 deaths
Norwegian male sport shooters
ISSF rifle shooters
Olympic shooters of Norway
Shooters at the 1936 Summer Olympics
Shooters at the 1948 Summer Olympics
Shooters at the 1952 Summer Olympics
Sportspeople from Oslo
20th-century Norwegian people